Cnaphalocrocis grisealis is a moth in the family Crambidae. It was described by Jean Ghesquière in 1942. It is found in the former provinces of Équateur and Katanga in the Democratic Republic of the Congo.

References

Moths described in 1942
Spilomelinae